Amérique is the French translation of America. 

It may also refer to:
Amériques, a composition for orchestra by Edgard Varèse
L'Amérique, a version of Yellow River (song) by Joe Dassin
L'Amérique, a 1979 novel by Jean Thibaudeau
L'Amérique, several translations and adaptations of Amerika (novel) by Franz Kafka
L'Amérique, a sculpture by Gilles Guérin
L'Amérique, a song by France Gall

See also 
 Americas § French
 America (disambiguation)